Matsuki (written:  or ) is a Japanese surname. Notable people with the surname include:

, Japanese baseball player and manager
, Japanese politician
, Japanese voice actress
Samizu Matsuki (born 1936), Japanese artist and educator
, original name Zhao Dayu, China-born Japanese footballer and manager
, Japanese footballer and manager

Matsuki is also a masculine Japanese given name. Notable people with the name include:

, Japanese physician

See also
8693 Matsuki, a main-belt asteroid

Japanese masculine given names
Japanese-language surnames